Warkentin is a surname of Russian Mennonite origin, and may refer to:

 Chris Warkentin (born 1978), Canadian politician
 E.H. Warkentin (born 1933), American politician and businessman
 Lindsay Warkentin (born 1982), Canadian curler
 Mark Warkentin (born 1979), American swimmer
 Sabine Warkentin (born 1941), French chess master

See also 
 Warkentin House

Danish-language surnames
Surnames of Danish origin
Russian Mennonite surnames